Port of Augusta is a port serving Augusta, Sicily. In 2007, 33.041 million tonnes passed through the port.

History
The natural port has been used since ancient times. It wasn't until the 1930s though that the Italian Navy developed the port and established an important military base to exercise control of the coast. The port was used by the Royal Navy during the war between Italy and Turkey for ten years, and during the landing in Sicily by the Allies the port was subjected to repeated raids. It was occupied by the British Navy from 1943 to 1946. Oil tycoon Angelo Moratti's oil refinery Rasiom Moratti was built in 1949, marking the beginning of its history as a large-scale industrial harbor, nowadays part of the petrochemical complex Augusta-Priolo. It underwent significant development in the 1950s and early 1960s with the establishment of Sincat, belonging to the Edison Group, which operated in the sectors of inorganic chemicals and fertilizers, the power plant Tifeo, and numerous other firms including Liquigas, Ilgas, Sotis Cables and Siciltubi.

References

External links
Official site

Ports and harbours of Italy